Wood is a common anglophone surname.  Notable people with the surname Wood include:

A
 Adam Wood (born 1955), British diplomat
 Adrian H. Wood, American educator and writer
 Aimee Lou Wood, English actress
 Alan Wood (disambiguation), several people
 Alan Wood (Australian politician) (1927–2005), Victorian state politician
 Alan Wood (engineer) (born 1947), British engineer and executive
 Alan Wood Jr. (1834–1902), U.S. Representative from Pennsylvania
 Alan Wood (footballer, born 1941), Welsh football player
 Alan Wood (footballer, born 1954), English football player
 Alan Wood (military officer) (1922–2013), American naval officer
 Alan Muir Wood (1921–2009), British civil engineer
 Alan Thorpe Richard Wood (born 1954), British public servant
 Albert Beaumont Wood, British physicist
 Alex Wood (disambiguation), several people, including
 Alex Wood (baseball) (born 1991), baseball pitcher
 Alex Wood (politician) (born 1950), former Labour leader of Edinburgh City Council in Scotland
 Alex Wood (ice hockey) (1909–1979), ice hockey goaltender
 Alex Wood (American football) (born 1955), college football coach
 Alex Wood (bishop) (1871–1937), Anglican bishop in India
 Alexander Wood (merchant), city magistrate in York, Upper Canada
 Alexander Wood (physician), inventor of hypodermic needle
 Alice Robinson Boise Wood (1846–1919), American classiest classicist and poet
 Allan Singleton-Wood (born 1933), British musician and publisher who performed under the stage name Allan Wood
 Allan Wood (born 1943), Australian swimmer
 Allen W. Wood (born 1942), American philosopher
 Alson Wood, American politician
 Andrew Wood (disambiguation), several people, including
 Andrew Wood of Largo (died 1515), Scottish admiral
 Andrew Wood (bishop) (died 1695), Scottish prelate
 Andrew Wood (surgeon) (1810–1881), Scottish surgeon
 Andrew Trew Wood (1826–1903), Canadian businessman and parliamentarian
 Andrew Wood (diplomat) (born 1940), British diplomat
 Andy Wood (historian) (born 1967), British social historian
 Andrew Wood (singer) (1966–1990), lead singer of Mother Love Bone and Malfunkshun
 Andy Wood (comedian) (born 1977), American comedian and producer
Anson S. Wood (1834–1904), American lawyer and politician
 Anthony Wood (disambiguation), several people
 Anthony Wood (antiquary) (1632–1695), English antiquary
 Anthony Wood (businessman) (born 1965/66), British-born American billionaire businessman
 Anthony Wood (historian) (1923–1987), British school teacher and historian
 Anthony Wood (artist) (1925–2022), British heraldic artist
 Ardeth Wood (1975–2003), graduate student at the University of Waterloo

B
 Barbara Wood, American writer
 Barnabas Wood, American dentist and namesake of Wood's metal
 Barry Wood (cricketer), cricketer
 Barry Wood (football), American football quarterback and microbiologist
 Barry Wood (interior designer), American designer
 Barry Wood (singer), American singer
 Basil Wood, (1900–1977), English footballer
 Beatrice Wood, American artist
 Benjamin Wood (disambiguation)
 Bernard Wood (cricketer), New Zealand cricketer and golfer
 Beth Wood (born 1954), North Carolina public official and accountant
 Bill Wood (disambiguation)
 Bill Wood (American football) (1894–1966), American football player and coach
 Bill Wood (Australian footballer) (1921–1989), Australian rules footballer 
 Bill Wood (footballer, born 1927), English footballer
 Bill Wood (politician) (born 1935), Australian politician
 Bill Wood (baseball) (born 1941), baseball scout
 Brandon Wood, American baseball player
 Brandon Wood (basketball), American pro basketball player

C
Carl Wood, in vitro fertilization pioneer at Monash University
Casey Albert Wood (1856–1942), American ophthalmologist and zoologist
Cathy Wood, American serial killer of Gwendolyn Graham and Cathy Wood
Charles Wood (disambiguation), several people
Charles Wood, 1st Viscount Halifax (1800–1885), English politician
Charles Wood, 2nd Viscount Halifax (1839–1934), English politician
Charles Wood, 2nd Earl of Halifax (1912–1980), British politician and peer
Charles Wood (businessman) (1914–2004), American businessman
Charles Wood (composer) (1866–1926), Irish composer and teacher
Charles Wood (ironmaster) (1702–1774), British chemist
Charles Wood (jockey) (1855–1945), British jockey
Charles Wood (playwright) (born 1932), British playwright and screenwriter
Charles Wood (scientist), British scientist
Charles Wood (singer and actor), on Broadway
Charles Chatworthy Wood Taylor (1792–1856), English artist and engineer, designer of the coat of arms of Chile
Charles Erskine Scott Wood, American author, activist, and attorney
Charles H. Wood, British chemist
Charles Thorold Wood (1777–1852), English ornithologist
Charles Winter Wood, football coach for Tuskegee University Golden Tigers
Charlie Wood, cofounder of the Northern Cree Singers
Chris Wood (disambiguation), several people
 Chris Wood (actor) (born 1988), American actor
 Chris Wood (cricketer) (born 1990), English Cricketer
Chris Wood (CIA), Counterterrorism officer of the CIA who hunted Osama Bin Laden
 Chris Wood (diplomat) (born 1959), British diplomat
 Chris Wood (folk musician), English folk singer and musician
 Chris Wood (footballer, born 1955), English footballer who played for Huddersfield Town
 Chris Wood (footballer, born 1987), English footballer who formerly played for Mansfield town, now Worksop Town
 Chris Wood (footballer, born 1991), Burnley and New Zealand international footballer
 Chris Wood (golfer) (born 1987), British golfer
 Chris Wood (jazz musician) (born 1969), bassist with the trio Medeski Martin & Wood
 Chris Wood (rock musician) (1944–1983), saxophonist, flautist with the rock band Traffic
 Chris Foote Wood (born 1940), Liberal Democrat politician in County Durham, England
Christopher Wood (disambiguation), several people
Christopher Wood (art historian) (born 1961), professor at New York University
Christopher Wood (biologist), professor of biology at McMaster University
Christopher Wood (composer), Welsh composer
Christopher Wood (cricketer, born 1934) (1934–2006), English cricketer
Christopher Wood (financial analyst), managing director of the broking firm CLSA
Christopher Wood (painter) "Kit Wood" (1901–1930), English painter
Christopher Wood (socialite) (1900–1976), partner of Gerald Heard
Christopher Wood (writer) (1935–2015), English screenwriter and novelist
Christopher Wood, who killed his wife, children, and himself in 2009, followed by that of William Parente
Clare Wood, British pro tennis player
Connor Wood (basketball) (born 1993), Canadian basketball player
Corinne Wood (1954-2021}, American politician,first female lieutenant governor of Illinois
Craig Wood (disambiguation), several people
Craig Wood (film editor), film editor
Craig Wood (golfer) (1901–1968), professional golfer
Craig Wood (guitarist) (born 1978), guitarist for Avril Lavigne
Cynthia Wood, (born 1950), American model and actress

D
 Darren Wood, English football player
 DaShaun Wood, American pro basketball player
 David Wood (disambiguation), several people
 David Wood (actor) (born 1944), English actor and playwright
 David Wood (basketball) (born 1964), American professional basketball player
 David Wood (British Army officer) (1923–2009), British Army officer
 David Wood (cricketer) (born 1965), English cricketer
 David Wood (environmental campaigner) (1963–2006), Executive Director of the GrassRoots Recycling Network
 David Wood (journalist), American journalist
 David Wood (judge) (born 1948), British judge
 David Wood (mathematician) (born 1971), Australian mathematician
 David Wood (New Zealand musician), musician with Straitjacket Fits
 David Wood (philosopher) (born 1946), professor of philosophy at Vanderbilt University
 David Wood (politician) (born 1961), member of the Missouri House of Representatives
 David Duffield Wood (1838–1910), American composer, educator, and musician
 Denis Wood, author and professor of Design at North Carolina State University
 Dennis Wood (1934–2001), Welsh geologist
 Doc Wood, American pro baseball player
 Dominic Wood, British actor
 Donald Wood (1933–2015), Canadian politician, businessman and farmer
 Donald Wood-Smith Australian-born Professor of Clinical Surgery
 Doug Wood (athlete) (born 1966), Canadian pole vaulter
 Dougie Wood (born 1940), Scottish athlete and football coach
 Douglas Wood (disambiguation), several people
 Douglas Wood (actor) (1880–1966), American actor of stage and screen
 Douglas Wood (engineer) (born 1941), engineer taken hostage in Iraq in 2005
 Douglas Wood (naturalist) (f. 1990-2000s), US author and musician.
 Douglas Wood (writer), US actor, writer, producer of television shows and animated movies

E
 Easton Wood (born 1989), Australian footballer
 Edmund Burke Wood, Canadian politician and judge
 Ed Wood Edward D. Wood, Jr. (1924–1978), American film director
 Elijah Wood, (born 1981), American actor
 Elisabeth Jean Wood, American political scientist
 Elizabeth Wood (disambiguation), several people
 Elizabeth Boleyn, Lady Boleyn (fl. 1530s), née Elizabeth Wood, witness against her niece, Anne Boleyn
 Elizabeth Wood (director), American film director
 Elizabeth Wood (executive) (1899–1993), executive director, Chicago Housing Authority
 Elizabeth A. Wood (1912–2006), American crystallographer
 Elizabeth Wyn Wood (1903–1966), Canadian sculptor
 Enoch Wood (1759–1840), English potter
 Eric Wood, (born 1986), American football player
 Evan Rachel Wood, American actress
 Evelyn Wood British Army officer, Colonial wars 1855–1905 
 Evelyn Wood American educator known for speed reading

F
 Fernando Wood (1812–1881), mayor of New York City
 Francis C. Wood (1869–1951), American cancer researcher with Crocker Institute
 Francis Marion Wood (1878–1943), American educator and school administrator
 Frank Wood (disambiguation), several people
 Frank Wood (actor) (born 1960), American actor
 Frank Wood (Iowa politician) (born 1951)
 Frank Bradshaw Wood (1915–1997), American astronomer
 Frank Porter Wood (1882–1955), Canadian art collector
 Freeman Wood (1896–1956), American actor

G
 G. Wood (1919–2000), American actor
 Gaby Wood (born 1971), English journalist and literary critic
 Garfield Wood, (1880–1971) American inventor, entrepreneur, motorboat builder and racer
 Garth Wood (born 1978), Australian boxer and rugby league footballer
 George Wood (disambiguation), various people
 Pseudonym for Fritz Kolbe (1900–1971), German spy for the US during World War II
 George Wood, founder of Wawa Food Markets
 George Wood (actor) (born 1981), English actor, singer, and composer
 George Wood (baseball) (1858–1924), Canadian baseball player and manager
 George Wood (British Army officer) (1898–1982), during World War II
 George Wood (Canadian politician) (1888–1966), member of Parliament, Brant, Ontario
 George Wood (cricketer, born 1893) (1893–1971), English cricketer
 George Wood (died 1558), MP for Flintshire
 George Wood (footballer) (born 1952), Scottish footballer
 George Wood (gymnast) (born 1999), British acrobatic gymnast
 George Wood (judge) (1743–1824), English lawyer and politician
 George Wood (New Zealand politician) (born 1946), New Zealand politician
 George Wood (Radio Sweden) (born 1949), American journalist
 George Wood (New Zealand politician) (born 1946), former mayor of North Shore City, Auckland, New Zealand
 George Wood (Somerset cricketer) (1865–1948), first-class cricketer who played three matches in 1893 and 1894
 George Wood (Yorkshire cricketer) (1862–1948), first-class cricketer who played two matches for Yorkshire
 George Adam Wood (1767–1831), British Army officer of the Napoleonic Era
 George Arnold Wood (1865–1928), Australian historian
 George Bacon Wood (1797–1879), American physician and writer
 George Herbert Wood (1867–1949), Canadian businessman who co-founded Wood Gundy and Company
 George Henry Wood (railway director), director of the Isle of Man Railway
 George Henry Wood (statistician) (1874–1945), English labour statistician
 George Ingersoll Wood (1814–1899), American clergyman
 George O. Wood, current General Superintendent of the Assemblies of God
 George Tyler Wood (1795–1858), governor of Texas
 George W. Wood (1808–1871), US politician
 George Warren Wood, Presbyterian minister and missionary
 George William Wood (1781–1843), English businessman and MP
 Wee Georgie Wood (1894–1979), English actor
 Gerald Wood (born 1926), Barbadian cricketer
 Gloria Wood (1923–1995), American singer and cartoon voice actress
 Gordon Wood (disambiguation), several people
 Gordon Wood (American football coach) (1914–2003), high school football coach in Texas
 Gordon Wood (rugby union) (1931–1982), rugby union footballer
 Gordon Eric Wood, Australian jailed then acquitted of the murder of Caroline Byrne
 Gordon S. Wood (born 1933), American historian
 Graeme Wood (disambiguation), several people
Graeme Wood (businessman) (born 1947), Australian entrepreneur and environmentalist
Graeme Wood (cricketer) (born 1956), Australian former cricketer
Graeme Wood (journalist) (born 1979), American journalist and academic
 Graham Wood (disambiguation), several people
 Graham Wood (field hockey) (born 1936), Australian former field hockey player
 Graham Wood (musician) (1971–2017), Australian jazz pianist
 Grant Wood (1891–1942), American painter

H 

Harold Wood (disambiguation), several people
 Harold Wood (minister) (1896–1989), minister, Uniting Church of Australia
 Harold D'Arcy Wood, minister, Uniting Church of Australia
 Harold Kenneth Wood (1906–1972), US federal judge
Harry Wood (disambiguation), several people
 Harry Wood (athlete) (1902–1975), British long-distance runner
 Harry Wood (aviator) (1894–1959), World War I flying ace
 Harry Wood (baseball) (1885–1955), baseball player
 Henry Wood (cricketer, born 1853) (1853–1919), Henry "Harry" Wood, English cricketer
 Harry Wood (footballer, born 1868) (1868–1951), England international footballer
 Harry Wood (Manitoba politician)
 Harry Blanshard Wood (1882–1924), British soldier and Victoria Cross recipient
 Harry E. Wood (1926–2009), United States federal judge
 Harry Edwin Wood (1881–1946), English astronomer in South Africa
 Harry Harvey Wood (1903–1977), co-founder of the Edinburgh International Festival
 Harry O. Wood (1879–1958), American seismologist who updated the Mercalli Intensity Scale
 Hart Wood (1880–1957), American architect
Henry Wood (disambiguation), Several people
 Sir Henry Wood (1869–1944), orchestral conductor
 Mrs Henry Wood Ellen Wood (1814–1887), British novelist
 Sir Henry Wood, 1st Baronet (1597–1671), Member of Parliament of England for Hythe 1661–1671
 Sir Evelyn Wood (British Army officer) Henry Evelyn Wood (1838–1919), Victoria Cross recipient
 Henry Wood (cricketer, born 1853) (1853–1919), English cricketer
 Henry Wood (minstrel) (19th-century) minstrel show manager in New York City
 Henry Wood (Somerset cricketer) (1872–1950)
 Henry Clay Wood (1832–1918), American Civil War general
 Henry Conwell Wood (1840–1926), member of the Queensland Legislative Council
 Henry Evelyn Wood known as Evelyn Wood (British Army officer) (1838–1919), British field marshal and Victoria Cross recipient
 Henry Moses Wood (1788–1867), architect based in Nottingham
 Henry Walter Wood (1825–1869), English architect
 Henry Wise Wood (1860–1941), Alberta politician
 Ellen Wood (author) (1814–1887), writing as Mrs Henry Wood, English novelist
 Hugh Wood (born 1932), composer

I
 Ida Wood (1838–1932), American recluse
 Issy Wood (born 1993), American artist
 Ivor Wood (1932–2004), Anglo-French animator, director and producer of children's television series including Postman Pat and Paddington

J
 J. Wood, English cricketer
 Jack Wood (cricketer) (born 1994), English cricketer
 James Wood (disambiguation), several people
 James Wood (Canadian admiral) (born 1934), Canadian admiral
 James Wood (composer), (born 1953), British composer, percussionist and conductor
 James Wood (critic) (born 1965), British literary critic and novelist
 James Wood (encyclopaedist) (1820–1901), British editor of The Nuttall Encyclopaedia
 James Wood (engineer), American engineer
 James Wood (governor) (1741–1813), Governor of Virginia and officer in the American Revolutionary War
 James Wood (musician) (born 1953), British composer and percussionist
 James Wood (New York politician) (1820–1892), New York politician and Union Army general
 James Wood (Irish politician) (1865–1936), Member of Parliament for East Down, 1902–1906
 James Wood (footballer) (1893–?), professional footballer, who played for South Shields, Huddersfield Town and Blackpool
 James Wood (South African cricketer) (born 1985), South African cricketer, played for Durham UCCE
 James Wood (Lancashire cricketer) (1933–1977), English cricketer for Lancashire 1954–56
 James Wood (mathematician) (1760–1839), Dean of Ely 1820–1839
 James Wood (minister) (1672–1759), English Presbyterian minister
 James Wood Bush (c. 1844–1906), Hawaiian-American Civil War combatant
 Sir James Wood, 2nd Baronet (died 1738), Scottish officer of the Dutch States Army and later the British Army
 James Wood, Lord Irwin (born 1977), British courtesy peer
 James Athol Wood (1756–1829), British rear-admiral
 James Frederick Wood (1813–1883), Archbishop of Philadelphia
 James Julius Wood (1800–1877), Scottish minister
 James N. Wood (1941–2010), American director of the Art Institute of Chicago
 James Roland Wood (born 1941), Australian Royal Commissioner and jurist
 James Rushmore Wood (1816–1882), American physician
 James Sebastian Lamin Wood, Sebastian Wood (born 1961), British Ambassador to China
 James W. Wood (1924–1990), US Air Force colonel and senior test pilot on the Dyna-Soar program
 Jamie Wood (born 1978), footballer
 Jason Wood (disambiguation), several people
 Jason Wood (baseball) (born 1969), former Major League Baseball player
 Jason Wood (comedian) (1972–2010), British comedian
 Jason Wood (musician), lead singer of metalcore band It Dies Today
 Jason Wood (politician) (born 1968), Australian politician
 Jason Wood (writer), British writer
 Jeff Wood (disambiguation), several people
 Jeff Wood (footballer) (born 1954), English former football goalkeeper
 Jeff Wood (racing driver) (born 1957), former race car driver
 Jeff Wood (singer) (born 1968), country music artist
 Jefferson Wood (born 1973), American Illustrator
 Jeffery Lee Wood (born 1973), prisoner on Texas death row
 Jeffery Wood (born 1986), American actor
 Jeffrey Wood (born 1969), Canadian politician
 Jim Wood (American football) (born 1936), American gridiron football player and coach
 Jim Wood (Arkansas politician) (fl. late 20th century), State Auditor of Arkansas
 Jim Wood (biathlete) (born 1952), British Olympic biathlete
 Jim Wood (fiddler) (born 1964), American fiddler
 Jim Wood (California politician) (born 1960), member of the California State Assembly
 Jim Wood (Sussex cricketer) (1914–1989), English cricketer, played for Sussex 1936–55
 Jimmy Wood (1842–1927), American baseball player and manager
 Joe Wood (disambiguation), several people
 Joe Wood (infielder) (1919–1985), American baseball player 
 Joe Wood (1944 pitcher) (1916–2002), baseball pitcher for Boston Red Sox; son of Smoky Joe
 Joe Wood (footballer) (1904–1972), Australian footballer for North Melbourne
 Joe Wood (musician) (fl. c. 1980), singer among band T.S.O.L.'s second complement of musicians
 Smoky Joe Wood (1889–1985), American baseball player
 Joe T. Wood (1922–2019), American politician
 John Wood (disambiguation), several people
 John Wood (actor, born 1946) (born 1946), Australian actor
 John Wood (English actor) (1930–2011), known for Shakespearean roles and his association with Tom Stoppard
 John Wood (governor) (1798–1880), governor of Illinois 1860–1861
 John Wood (judge) (died 1979), American federal judge, assassinated
 John Wood (Kent cricketer, born 1745)
 John Wood (Surrey cricketer, born 1744)
 John Wood, the Elder (1704–1754), English architect, known for Queen Square and The Circus in Bath
 John Wood, the Younger (1728–1782), English architect (son of John Wood), known for the Royal Crescent in Bath
 John Augustus Wood (1818–1878), British soldier and Victoria Cross recipient
 John G. Wood, veteran of the British far right and member of the British Peoples Party
 John Medley Wood (1827–1915), South African botanist known for sugarcane work
 John Stephens Wood (1885–1968), chairman of the House Un-American Activities Committee
 John Taylor Wood (1830–1904), officer in the US Navy and Confederate Navy captain during the American Civil War
 John Travers Wood, American Representative from Idaho
 John William Wood Sr. (1855–1928), North Carolina State Representative, founder of Benson, North Carolina
 Julia A. Wood (1840-1927), American writer, composer
 Julia Amanda Sargent Wood (1825–1903), American author
 Juston Wood (born 1979), American football player

K
 Keith Wood, (born 1972), rugby union player for Ireland, Harlequin F.C. and Munster Rugby
 Keith Porteous Wood, Executive Director of the National Secular Society (UK)
 Kerry Wood, American baseball player
 Kimba Wood, American Federal judge

L
 Leonard Wood, US Army Chief of Staff and Governor General of the Philippines
 Leon Wood (born 1962), American basketball player and basketball game official
 Leon J. Wood, American theologian
 Lynn Faulds Wood (1948–2020), Scottish television presenter and journalist

M
 Mark Wood (disambiguation), several people, including
 Sir Mark Wood, 1st Baronet (1750–1829), British Member of Parliament for Newark, Milborne Port and Gatton
 Mark Wood (bishop) (1919–2014), Bishop of Matabeleland and Bishop of Ludlow
 Mark Wood (businessman) (born 1953), British businessman
 Mark Wood (cricketer) (born 1990), English cricketer
 Mark Wood (explorer) (born 1967), British Arctic and Antarctic explorer
 Mark Wood (footballer) (born 1972), English professional footballer
 Mark Wood (Medal of Honor) (1839–1866), American Civil War Medal of Honor recipient
 Mark Wood (violinist), electric violinist and former string master of the Trans-Siberian Orchestra
 Marshall Wood , English sculptor
 Marshall Wood, vocalist for Michigan heavy metal band Battlecross
 Martin Wood (disambiguation), several people
 Martin Wood (director), Canadian television director
 Martin Wood (engineer) (born 1927), co-founder of Oxford Instruments
 Martin Wood (rugby league) (born 1970), English former Rugby League footballer
 Martin B. Wood, American farmer, banker, telegraph installer and shareholder
 Mary Wood (disambiguation), several people
 Mary Wood (baseball), AAGPBL player
 Mary Antonia Wood (born 1959), American painter and sculptor
 Mary C. F. Hall-Wood (died 1899), poet, editor, author
 Mary Christina Wood, professor of law and author
 Mary Elizabeth Wood (1861–1931), American librarian and missionary
 Mary Evelyn Wood (1900–1978), politician and nurse in the Cayman Islands
 Mary Knight Wood (1857–1944), American pianist, music educator and composer
 Mary Myfanwy Wood (1882–1967), British missionary in China
 Mary Ramsey Wood (died 1908), American pioneer
 Matthew Wood (disambiguation), several people
Matthew Wood, killed in the January 2013 Vauxhall helicopter crash
Sir Matthew Wood, 4th Baronet (1857–1908), English cricketer
Matthew Wood (cricketer, born 1977), English cricketer with Glamorgan CCC
Matthew Wood (cricketer, born 1980), English cricketer with Nottinghamshire, previously played for Somerset
Matthew Wood (cricketer, born 1985), English cricketer
Matthew Wood (rugby league) (born 1969), Australian rugby league footballer
Matthew Wood (sound editor) (born 1972), American sound editor and voice actor
Sir Matthew Wood, 1st Baronet (1768–1843), MP and Lord Mayor of London
Wood (musician) (Matthew Wood, born 1979), drummer with British Sea Power
Matthew W. Wood (1879–1969), farmer and political figure on Prince Edward Island
 Merlyn Wood, member of Brockhampton (band)
 Michael Wood (disambiguation), several people
Michael Wood (academic) (active since 1971), former chair of the Princeton University English Department
Michael Wood (cryptographer), American author The Jesus Secret 2010
Michael Wood (doctor) (1918–1987), British doctor in East Africa
Michael Wood (historian) (born 1948), British historian and television presenter
Michael Wood (lawyer) (born 1947), British lawyer and former chief advisor to the Foreign and Commonwealth Office
Michael Wood (New Zealand politician) (born 1980), New Zealand member of parliament
Michael Wood (rugby union) (born 1999), Australian rugby union player
Michael M. Wood (21st century), American diplomat and ambassador
Mick Wood (footballer, born 1952), English association footballer
Mick Wood (footballer, born 1962), English association footballer
Mike Wood (disambiguation), several people, including
Mike Wood (American football) (born 1954), American football player
Mike Wood (baseball) (born 1980), American baseball player
Mike Wood (Conservative politician) (born 1976), MP for Dudley South since May 2015
Mike Wood (curler) (born 1968), Canadian curler
Mike Wood (fencer) (born 1971), South African épée fencer
Mike Wood (Labour politician) (born 1946), British MP for Batley and Spen from 1997 to 2015
Miles Wood (born 1995), American ice hockey player

N
 Natalie Wood (1938–1981), American actress
 Nick Wood (rugby union), English rugby union player
 Norman Wood (disambiguation), several people
Norman Wood (golfer) (born 1947), Scottish golfer
Norman Wood (badminton), English badminton player
Norman Wood (footballer, born 1889) (1889–1916), English footballer
Norman Wood (footballer, born 1932), English footballer for Sunderland
Norman Wood (politician) (1891–1988), member of the Pennsylvania House of Representatives

O
 Oliver Wood, Harry Potter character
 Otto Wood (1894–1930), American criminal

P
 Paul Wood (disambiguation), several people
Peter Wood, 3rd Earl of Halifax (born 1944), British peer
 Paul Wood (footballer) (born 1964), English former footballer
 Paul Wood (journalist), correspondent for the BBC
 Paul Wood (rugby league) (born 1981), English rugby league footballer
 Paul Hamilton Wood (1907–1962), Australian cardiologist
 Peggy Wood (1892–1978), American actress
 Pete Wood (1867–1923), Canadian-American Major League Baseball pitcher
 Peter Wood (disambiguation), several people
 Peter Atte Wode (fl. c. 1325–1382), English justice
 Peter Hill-Wood (1936-2018), English businessman
 Peter Wood, Australian businessman and founding partner G. Wood, Son & Co.
 Peter Wood (businessman), founder of insurance companies Direct Line and Esure
 Peter Wood (cricketer) (born 1951), English cricketer
 Peter Wood (director) (1925–2016), English theatre director
 Peter Wood (footballer, born 1946), Australian rules football player for Fitzroy
 Peter Wood (footballer, born 1939), Australian rules football player for Footscray
 Peter Wood (politician) (1935–2010), member of the Queensland Legislative Assembly
 Peter H. Wood (born 1943), American historian and author
 Peter K. Wood (born 1984), American entertainer and magician

R
 Ralph Wood (1715–1772) and his son and grandson of same name, English potters
 Ray Wood (1931–2002), English footballer, goalkeeper for Manchester United
 Rex Wood (1909–1970), South Australian artist in Portugal
 Robert Wood (disambiguation), several people

Robert Wood (American politician) (1885–?), Wisconsin State Assemblyman
 Robert Wood (antiquarian) (1717–1771), English civil servant and politician
 Robert Wood (artist), accused and acquitted of the Camden Town murder
 Robert Wood (Australian politician) (born 1949), senator for New South Wales
 Robert Wood (Australian rugby player) (born 1948), rugby union player for Australia
 Robert Wood (mathematician) (1622–1685), English mathematician
 Robert Wood (psychologist) (born 1941), British psychologist and writer
 Robert Wood (roboticist), Harvard University professor and innovator in robotics
 Robert Wood (rugby) (1872–1928), rugby league footballer who played in the 1890s
 Robert Wood (timber merchant) (1792–1847), claimed to be the son of Prince Edward Augustus of the UK
 Robert Wood (television executive) (died 1986), American television executive
 Robert Wood (timber merchant) (1792–1847), Canadian who claimed to be son of Prince Edward Augustus
 Robert B. Wood (1836–1878), American Civil War sailor and Medal of Honor recipient
 Robert Coldwell Wood (1923–2005), American political scientist and academic
 Robert E. Wood (1879–1969), American soldier and businessman
 Robert E. Wood (painter, born 1971) (born 1971), Canadian landscape artist
 Robert J. Wood (1905–1986), US Army general
 Robert James Wood (1886–1954), Liberal party member of the Canadian House of Commons
 Robert S. Wood (born 1936), American military leader and Mormon leader
 Robert Stanford Wood (1886–1963), civil servant and educational administrator
 Robert W. Wood or Robert Williams Wood (1868–1955), American physicist and writer
 Robert Watson Wood (1923-2018), American clergyman, LGBT rights activist, and author
 Robert William Wood (1889–1979), American landscape artist

 Robin Wood (1944–2021), Paraguayan comic book writer and author
 Roger Wood (disambiguation), several people
Roger Wood (governor) (died 1654), governor of Bermuda, 1629–1637
Roger Wood (journalist) (1925–2012), Belgian-born British editor
Roger Leigh-Wood (1906–1987), English Olympic athlete
 Ron Wood (Australian footballer) (1923–1978), Australian rules footballer with Geelong
 Ronnie Wood (born 1947), musician, member of The Rolling Stones
 Ronnie Wood (ice hockey) (born 1960), Scottish professional ice hockey player
 Roy Wood (born 1946), musician with The Move, Electric Light Orchestra and Wizzard
 Roy Wood (baseball) (1892–1974), baseball player
 Roy Wood Jr. (1978), American comedian and actor

S
 S. A. M. Wood (1823–1891), Confederate Civil War General
 Samuel Wood (disambiguation), several people
Sam Wood (1884–1949), American film director
Sam Wood (artist), game artist
Sam Wood (archaeologist), archaeologist and TV presenter
Sam Wood (cricketer) (born 1993), English cricketer
Sam Wood (footballer) (born 1986), English footballer
Sam Wood (rugby league, born 1994), English rugby league player
Sam Wood (rugby league, born 1997), English rugby league player
Samuel Wood (Lower Canada politician) (1787–1848), farmer and political figure in Lower Canada
Samuel Wood (Ontario politician) (1830–1913), Canadian politician
Samuel Wood (philanthropist), a founder of the New York Institute for the Blind
Samuel H. Wood, US scientist who cloned himself
Samuel Newitt Wood (1825–1891), American populist politician from Kansas
Samuel Peploe Wood (1827–1873), English artist
 Sandra Scarr Sandra Wood Scarr, American psychologist
 Sara Anne Wood (born 1981), American girl (Disappearance of Sara Anne Wood) who disappeared in 1993
 Scott Wood (born 1990), American basketball player
 Scott Wood (American football) (born 1968), American football player
 Sebastian Wood (born 1961), British Ambassador to China
 Sidney Wood (1911–2009)), American tennis player
 Silas Wood (1769–1847), US Congressman from New York State
 Smoky Joe Wood, (1889–1985) American baseball player
 Spencer S. Wood (1861–1940), US Navy rear admiral
 Stan Wood, (1905–67) English football player
 Steve Wood (disambiguation), various people
 Stephen Mosher Wood, Kansas politician
 Stephen W. Wood, Republican assemblyman from North Carolina
 Steve Wood (bishop) (born 1963), American first bishop of the Anglican Diocese of the Carolinas
 Steve Wood (footballer, born February 1963), English football player for Reading
 Steve Wood (footballer, born June 1963), English football player
 Steven Wood, founder of Northern Cree Singers
 Steven Wood (1961–1995), Australian canoeist
Sue Wood (Suzanne Wood, born 1948), New Zealand politician
 Susan Wood (disambiguation), several people
Susan Wood (New Zealand writer) (1836–1880)
Susan Wood (pharmacologist) (1952–1998), British pharmacologist and medical regulator
Susan Wood (poet) (born 1946), professor at Rice University
Susan Wood (science fiction) (1948–1980), Canadian professor, critic, and science fiction fan
Susan Wood (television presenter), former news presenter from New Zealand

T
 Thomas Wood (disambiguation), several people
 Thomas Wood (1708–1799), British MP for Middlesex
 Thomas Wood (1777–1860), British MP for Breconshire
 Thomas Wood (1815–98) (1815–1898), Canadian politician
 Thomas Wood (bishop of Lichfield and Coventry) (1607–1692), Anglican diocesan bishop
 Thomas Wood (bishop of Bedford) (1885–1961), Anglican suffragan bishop
 Thomas Wood (British Army officer) (1804–1872), British MP for Middlesex
 Thomas Wood (composer) (1892–1950), English composer and author
 Thomas Wood (Derbyshire cricketer) (born 1994), English cricketer
 Thomas Wood (mayor) (1792–1861), mayor of Columbus, Ohio
 Leslie Wood (footballer) (Thomas Leslie Wooborn, 1932–2005), English footballer
 Thomas Wood (priest), Roman Catholic chaplain to Queen Mary of England
 Thomas Wood (reverend) (1711–1778), minister in Halifax, Nova Scotia, Canada
 Thomas Wood (Somerset cricketer) (1861–1933), English cricketer
 E. Thomas Wood (born 1963), American journalist and author
 Thomas Harold Wood (1889–1965), Canadian politician
 Thomas J. Wood (1823–1906), Union General during the American Civil War
 Thomas Jefferson Wood (1844–1908), US Representative from Indiana
 Thomas McKinnon Wood (1855–1927), British Liberal politician
 Thomas Mills Wood (born 1963), American film and television character actor
 Thomas Peploe Wood (1817–1845), English artist
 Thomas Waterman Wood (1823–1903), American painter
 Tom Wood (disambiguation), various people
 Tom Wood (author), British author of thriller novels
 Tom Wood (ice hockey) (1927–2015), Canadian ice hockey player
 Tom Wood (photographer) (born 1951)
 Tom Wood (rugby union) (born 1986), English rugby union player
 Tom Wood (visual effects), visual effects supervisor

U
 Ursula Wood (artist), (1868–1925) English artist

V
 Victor Wood (1946-2021), Filipino singer
 Victoria Wood (1953–2016), British comedian

W
 W. A. R. Wood (William Alfred Rae Wood) (1878–1970), British diplomat in Siam
 Wallace Wood, (1927–1981), American writer-illustrator
 Walter Childs Wood (1864–1953), American surgeon and politician
 Warren L. Wood (1910–1980), American politician
 Wilbur Wood (born 1941), American pro baseball player
 Wilfred Wood, (1897–1982) British soldier and Victoria Cross recipient
 Wilfred Wood (bishop),  the first black bishop in the Church of England
 Wilfrid Wood (1888–1976), English artist
 William Wood (disambiguation), several people
 William Wood (15th century MP), MP for Winchester, 1413
 William Wood, 1st Baron Hatherley (1801–1881), British statesman
 William Wood (athlete) (1881–1940), Canadian track and field athlete
 William Wood (Australian politician) (1869–1953)
 William Wood (botanist) (1745–1808), English Unitarian clergyman, botanist and activist
 William Wood (cricketer) (1849–1924), Australian cricketer
 William Wood (footballer, born 1900) (1900–?), English football player for Aberdare Athletic and Stoke
 William Wood (footballer, born April 1910) (1910–?), English football defender
 William Wood (footballer, born June 1910) (1910–1958), English footballer
 William Wood (footballer, born 1996), English football defender
 William Wood (historian) (1864–1947), Canadian historian
 William Wood (ironmaster) (1671–1730), British ironmaster and coin mintmaster
 William Wood (MP for Berkshire), Member of Parliament (MP) for Berkshire, 1395
 William Wood (MP for Pontefract), British MP for Pontefract
 William Wood (New Zealand politician) (1827–1884), New Zealand politician from Invercargill & Mataura
 William Wood (rower) (1899–1969), Canadian rower and Olympic silver medalist
 William Wood (Scottish surgeon) (1782–1858)
 William Wood (Texas politician), member of the Twentieth Texas Legislature
 William Wood (trade unionist) (1872/73–1956), British trade union leader
 William Wood (wrestler) (1888–?), British wrestler
 William Wood (zoologist) (1774–1857), English entomologist
 William B. Wood (actor) (1779–1861), theatre manager and actor
 William B. Wood (builder), American builder/contractor in Kentucky
 William Braucher Wood (born 1950), US diplomat
 William Bruce Wood (1848–1928), Canadian manufacturer and political figure
 William D. Wood (1822–1867), American Union brevet brigadier general
 William H. Wood, president of the National Association of Letter Carriers, 1889–90
 William H. Wood (American football) (1900–1988), American athlete and football coach
 William Halsey Wood (1855–1897), American architect
 William Henry Wood, British trade unionist, active in the 1860s
 William Holmes Wood (1900–1988), college football coach
 William J. Wood (1877–1954), Canadian painter and etcher
 William Madison Wood (1858–1926), mill owner from Massachusetts
 William McKenzie Wood, Canadian ambassador to Israel
 William Maxwell Wood (1809–1880), first Surgeon General of the US Navy
 William P. Wood (1820–1903), first Director of the United States Secret Service
 William R. Wood (Indiana politician) (1861–1933), US Representative from Indiana
 William Ransom Wood (1907–2001), president of the University of Alaska, 1960–1973
 William Robertson Wood (1874–1947), Presbyterian minister and politician in Manitoba, Canada
 William Thomas Wood (1854–1943), New Zealand politician
 William Valentine Wood (1883–1959), President of the London, Midland and Scottish Railway, 1941–1947
 William W. Wood (1818–1882), head of the Bureau of Steam Engineering, 1873–1877
 William Wightman Wood (fl. 1804–1833), American journalist, businessman and poet
 Willie Wood (disambiguation)
 Willie Wood (bowler) (born 1938), Scottish professional bowls player
 Willie Wood (American football) (1936–2020), American football player
 Willie Wood (golfer) (born 1960), American golfer
 Willie Wood (footballer), scored for Bury F.C. in the 1900 and 1903 FA Cup finals
 Willis A. Wood (1921–2021), American microbiologist, inventor, and entrepreneur
 Wilson Wood (actor) (1915–2014), American character actor
 Wilson Wood (footballer) (1943–2017), Scottish footballer

Z
 Zach Wood (born 1993), American football player

See also

First name unknown
 Wood (baseball), baseball player

Fictional characters
 Oliver Wood, a character from the Harry Potter novel series by J. K. Rowling

Lists of people by surname